Misunderstanding of a Dream is an Iranian television series directed by Fereydun Jeyrani and produced for IRIB TV1. It consists of 30 episodes, each 45 minutes long. It also features Armenian and Russian actors.

Plot 
The subject of the series the Iranian nuclear project and spy services.

Cast

Main
Amir Jafari
Dariush Arjmand
Pantea Bahram
Farhad Ghaemian
Setareh Hosseini
Soraya Ghasemi
Tigran Khzmalyan

Supporting
Ghasem Zare
Elham Korda
Negar Abedi

Awards and nominations

References 

Iranian television series
2010s Iranian television series
2015 Iranian television series debuts
2015 Iranian television series endings
Islamic Republic of Iran Broadcasting original programming
Persian-language television shows